Pentavision has released DJMax soundtracks featuring songs from the games in a digital and physical retail format. This is a list of these albums.

Digital audio soundtracks 
These soundtracks are being sold or have been sold in Korean digital music stores. After Vocal Paradigm albums others have been released as well. These albums contain various songs from the game series. Some have specific themes like concentrating only to rock or electronic genre. Portable Legacy and Portable Retro are essentially DJMax Portable original soundtrack repackaged into two separate albums which contain songs from both "L" and "R" in-game discs of DJMax Portable.

DJMax Portable 2 Vocal Paradigm 1

Vocal Paradigm was the first album ever released outside influence of the games on February 5, 2007. It contains nine original songs from the DJMax Portable 2 which wasn't released at the time Vocal Paradigm came out.

DJMax Portable Legacy

DJMax Portable Retro

DJMax Portable 2 Vocal Paradigm 2

Vocal Paradigm 2 is the second album released outside the game series. It was made available on March 22, 2007 and it contains nine songs from the DJMax Portable 2. It was released eight days before DJMax Portable 2 which was released March 30, 2007.

DJMax ROCK Tunes

DJMax ROCK Tunes is Korea only music album which features rock songs from DJMax game series. It is one of the five albums released in conjunction to celebrate release of DJMax Portable 3.

DJMax ANIPOP Tunes

DJMax ANIPOP Tunes  is one of the five albums released in conjunction to celebrate release of DJMax Portable 3. Anipop Tunes collects Japanese pop stylish songs from DJMax games to one record.

DJMax ELECTRONIC Tunes

DJMax ELECTRONIC Tunes is one of the five albums released in conjunction to celebrate release of DJMax Portable 3. It features songs from the various electronic subgenres such as Melodic Trance and Electro house.

DJMax EXCLUSIVE Remixes

DJMax EXCLUSIVE Remixes is one of the five albums released in conjunction to celebrate release of DJMax Portable 3.

DJMax MANIAC Tunes

DJMax MANIAC Tunes is one of the five albums released in conjunction to celebrate release of DJMax Portable 3.

Physical Audio Soundtracks 
These soundtracks have only come bundled with the collector's editions of their respective games unless noted. Exceptionally every DJMax Trilogy package comes with the soundtrack included.
2006 - DJMAX PORTABLE Original Sound Tracks
2007 - DJMAX PORTABLE 2 Audio Trinity
2008 - DJMAX TECHNIKA: Original Soundtrack
2008 - DJMAX Portable BLACK SQUARE Original Soundtrack
2008 - DJMAX Trilogy OST
2010 - DJMAX TECHNIKA 2 Original Soundtrack
2010 - DJMAX Portable Hot Tunes Golden OST + Piano Collection
2011 - DJMAX Portable 3 Original Sound Track
2011 - DJMAX TECHNIKA 3 ORIGINAL SOUNDTRACK
2012 - DJMAX TECHNIKA TUNE Original Sound Track
2017 - DJMAX RESPECT Original Sound Track
2020 - DJMAX RESPECT V Original Sound Track

References 

DJMax games
Music video game soundtracks